At the 1904 Summer Olympics, seven wrestling events were contested, all in the freestyle discipline.  It was the first time freestyle wrestling was featured, as the first Olympic wrestling contests had been in the Greco-Roman style.  Weight classes also made their first appearance. The sport continues to be in the Olympic program to the present day.

Medal summary

Participating nations

A total of 42 wrestlers competed at the St. Louis Games:

 
 
 
 

The nationalities of many medalists are disputed, as many American competitors were recent immigrants to the United States who had not yet been granted US citizenship.

The International Olympic Committee considers Norwegian-American wrestlers Charles Ericksen and Bernhoff Hansen to have competed for the United States. Each man won a gold medal. In 2012, Norwegian historians however found documentation showing that Ericksen did not receive American citizenship until March 22, 1905, and that Hansen probably never received American citizenship. The historians have therefore petitioned the IOC to have the athletes registered as Norwegians.
In May 2013, it was reported that the Norwegian Olympic Committee had filed a formal application for changing the nationality of the wrestlers in the IOC's medal database.

Medal table

Notes

References
 International Olympic Committee medal database

 
1904 Summer Olympics events
1904